Olivibacter ginsenosidimutans is a Gram-negative, aerobic and rod-shaped bacterium from the genus of Olivibacter which has been isolated from compost.

References

Sphingobacteriia
Bacteria described in 2018